Machimia pyrocalyx is a moth in the family Depressariidae. It was described by Edward Meyrick in 1922. It is found in Santa Catarina, Brazil.

References

Moths described in 1922
Machimia